David Boyer Williams (February 7, 1913 – March 6, 1983) was an American professional basketball player. He played in the National Basketball League for the Indianapolis Kautskys and Toledo Jim White Chevrolets. For his career he averaged 2.9 points per game.

References 

1913 births
1983 deaths
American men's basketball players
Basketball players from Indiana
Centers (basketball)
Indianapolis Greyhounds men's basketball players
Indianapolis Kautskys players
People from Auburn, Indiana
Toledo Jim White Chevrolets players